Ante Vukušić (born 4 June 1991) is a Croatian professional footballer who plays as a forward for Serbian SuperLiga club Kolubara.

Club career
Vukušić started his career playing at youth level for his hometown club Junak Sinj. He joined Hajduk Split in 2007, and during his time at their youth academy was regarded as one of the most promising players.

Hajduk Split
In January 2009, he signed a professional -year contract with Hajduk keeping him at the club until summer 2014. He made his debut for the first team in a 5–0 win against Croatia Sesvete on 22 April 2009. In the last round of 2008–09 season, he scored his first goal in Prva HNL, a late equalizer against rivals Dinamo Zagreb.

In the 2009–10 season, Vukušić established himself as the first choice striker at the club. In 22 league appearances, he scored 6 goals and a further 2 goals in 5 cup appearances. His stature at the club at such a young age impressed many of Europe's top clubs and he was set to make a move away from the Croatian club but the management and he mutually chose for him to remain at the club for the following season.

In the 2010–11 season, he scored 14 league goals in 29 appearances, finishing the season as the club's top scorer. He also scored four goals in nine UEFA Europe League appearances, the most memorable of which was a last minute winner against Anderlecht.

At the start of the 2011–12 season, under new coach Krasimir Balakov, Vukušić continued as the first choice striker at the club, this time alongside new signing Ivan Vuković as the most preferred front duo. He scored his first goal of the 2011–12 Prva HNL only three minutes into the first match against Šibenik and added his second in a match against Rijeka. In doing so he injured his toe and was consequentially ruled out for the next four weeks. He ended the season with 12 league goals in 24 appearances and 15 total goals in 29 appearances which made him the top goalscorer at the club for the second year running.

The 2012–13 season at Hajduk started with another new coach, but Ante remained the first choice striker and captain at the club, despite his young age. He converted a penalty in Hajduk's 2–0 win over Italian club Internazionale at the San Siro.

Pescara
In August 2012, Vukušić was transferred to the newly promoted Serie A club Pescara for a reported fee of around €3.8 million. He was initially the first choice striker at the club, but ended up losing his place and managed just one goal in 19 appearances as Pescara were relegated.

Lausanne-Sport (loan)
In February 2014 he moved to Lausanne-Sport on a six-month loan.

Waasland-Beveren (loan)
In August 2014 he moved to Waasland-Beveren on a loan.

Greuther Fürth
He moved to Greuther Fürth on 29 January 2016. On 7 May 2016 he extended his contract until June 2018.

Tosno
On 5 June 2017, he signed a 2-year contract with the Russian Premier League club FC Tosno. Three weeks later, he underwent a surgery on his lungs, due to years-long medical problems.

Olimpia Grudziądz
On 7 March 2018, he signed with the Polish club Olimpia Grudziądz.
In the summer of 2018 he left Olimpia Grudziądz.

Krško
After leaving Grudziądz, he signed with Slovenian PrvaLiga club NK Krško, where he scored 4 goals in 27 appearances during the 2018–19 season.

FCSB
On 28 January 2021, it was announced that Vukušić signed with Romanian club FCSB.

International career
In May 2011, Vukušić was first called up to the Croatian senior team by manager Slaven Bilić for the UEFA Euro 2012 qualifying match against Georgia, but was later moved to the under-21 squad for their opening match in the 2013 UEFA European Under-21 Football Championship qualifications, also against Georgia. On 15 August 2012, he made his debut for the senior team under manager Igor Štimac as a second-half substitute in a 4–2 defeat against Switzerland.

Career statistics

Club

International

Honours
Hajduk Split
Croatian Cup: 2009–10

References

External links
 

1991 births
Living people
People from Sinj
Association football forwards
Croatian footballers
Croatia youth international footballers
Croatia under-21 international footballers
Croatia international footballers
HNK Hajduk Split players
Delfino Pescara 1936 players
FC Lausanne-Sport players
S.K. Beveren players
SpVgg Greuther Fürth players
SpVgg Greuther Fürth II players
FC Tosno players
Olimpia Grudziądz players
NK Krško players
NK Olimpija Ljubljana (2005) players
FC Steaua București players
A.C.R. Messina players
FK Tuzla City players
FK Kolubara players
Croatian Football League players
Serie A players
Serie B players
Swiss Super League players
Belgian Pro League players
2. Bundesliga players
Regionalliga players
I liga players
Slovenian PrvaLiga players
Liga I players
Serie C players
Premier League of Bosnia and Herzegovina players
Serbian SuperLiga players
Croatian expatriate footballers
Expatriate footballers in Italy
Expatriate footballers in Switzerland
Expatriate footballers in Belgium
Expatriate footballers in Germany
Expatriate footballers in Russia
Expatriate footballers in Poland
Expatriate footballers in Slovenia
Expatriate footballers in Romania
Expatriate footballers in Bosnia and Herzegovina
Expatriate footballers in Serbia
Croatian expatriate sportspeople in Italy
Croatian expatriate sportspeople in Switzerland
Croatian expatriate sportspeople in Belgium
Croatian expatriate sportspeople in Germany
Croatian expatriate sportspeople in Russia
Croatian expatriate sportspeople in Poland
Croatian expatriate sportspeople in Slovenia
Croatian expatriate sportspeople in Romania
Croatian expatriate sportspeople in Bosnia and Herzegovina
Croatian expatriate sportspeople in Serbia